Clube Desportivo Primeiro de Agosto is an Angolan women's basketball team based in Luanda. The team is part of the multi-sports club with the same name. The club is attached to the Angolan Armed Forces which is its main sponsor. 

Primeiro competes at the Luanda Provincial Basketball Championship and at the  Angola Women's Basketball League.

Honours

Players

Roster

Depth chart

Staff

Former notable players

Managers

External links
 
Africabasket profile (Women)

References

C.D. Primeiro de Agosto
Basketball teams established in 1977
Sports clubs in Angola
Basketball teams in Angola
1977 establishments in Angola